The Beden, badan, or alternate type names Beden-seyed and Beden-safar, is a fast, ancient Somali single or double-masted maritime vessel and ship, typified by its towering stern-post and powerful rudder. It is also the longest surviving sewn boat in the Horn of Africa and the Arabian Peninsula. Its shipyards predominantly lie in the northeastern Hafun region of Somalia (notably Bayla), as well as Muscat. There are 2 types of Beden ships, with one type geared towards fishing (the Beden-seyed) and the other, trading (Beden-safar). The ship is noticeable and unique in its strengthened and substantial gunwale, which is attached by treenail. Originally, all Beden ships were sewn with coiled coconut fibre, holding the hull planking, stem and stern-post. but Omani variants, beginning in the 20th century, began nailing instead of sewing the planks.

The badan  from the Arabian Peninsula and the beden from the Somali Peninsula are completely different ship types with different designs. The only thing that unites them is the similarity of the name.

See also
Somali maritime history

References

Bibliography

Ancient ships
Ancient Somalia
Ship types
Maritime history of Somalia
Somali inventions